The 2011–12 East Carolina Pirates men's basketball team represented East Carolina University during the 2011–2012 NCAA Division I basketball season.  The Pirates were coached by second year head coach Jeff Lebo. The Pirates played their home games at Williams Arena at Minges Coliseum and were members of Conference USA. They finished the season 15–16, 5–11 in C-USA play.

Recruiting

Roster

Schedule

               
|-               
               
|-               
               
|-               
               
|-               
               
|-               
               
|-               
               
|-               
               
|-               
               
|-               
               
|-               
               
|-               
               
|-               

|-

|-

|-

|-

|-

|-

|-

|-

|-

|-

|-

|-

|-

|-

|-

|-

|-
!colspan=9|2012 Conference USA men's basketball tournament†

|-

|-

References

East Carolina Pirates men's basketball seasons
East Carolina
East Carolina Pirates men's basketball
East Carolina Pirates men's basketball